Torcuato de Alvear y Saenz de la Quintanilla (Montevideo, 1822 – Buenos Aires, 1890) was a 19th-century Argentine conservative politician.  He was the son of soldier and statesman Carlos María de Alvear and father of Marcelo Torcuato de Alvear, president of Argentina from 1922 to 1928. He was also a Freemason.

In 1880 Buenos Aires was declared the capital city of Argentina, and Torcuato de Alvear served as the first mayor of the city until 1887.  During this period he improved the road and street networks, the water and electricity supply, public transport and street lighting and other public services.

References

1822 births
1890 deaths
People from Montevideo
Argentine people of Spanish descent
National Autonomist Party politicians
Mayors of Buenos Aires
Argentine Freemasons
Burials at La Recoleta Cemetery